Mrs Wilson (formerly known as The Wilsons) is a 2018 British historical drama serial, executive-produced by and starring Ruth Wilson. The actress plays her real-life grandmother, a widow who uncovers a mysterious and secret life following the death of her husband. It first aired on BBC One in the United Kingdom on 27 November 2018 and debuted in the United States on PBS Masterpiece on 31 March 2019. It aired in Ireland on RTÉ2 in May–June 2021.

Plot
In 1963, Alison Wilson's happy home life is shattered upon the death of her husband, novelist and former MI6 officer Alexander "Alec" Wilson. Everything she knew about her husband of 22 years quickly unravels when she discovers she is not the only Mrs Wilson. She tries to shield her two sons as she reconciles her marriage with her husband's activities as a foreign intelligence officer.

Cast
 Ruth Wilson as Alison Wilson
 Iain Glen as Alexander "Alec" Wilson
 Anupam Kher as Shahbaz Karim
 Patrick Kennedy as Dennis Wilson
 Otto Farrant as Nigel Wilson
 Calam Lynch as Gordon Wilson
 Fiona Shaw as Coleman
 Keeley Hawes as Dorothy Wick
 Elizabeth Rider as Gladys Wilson
 Gemma McElhinney as Elizabeth Wilson
 Wilf Scolding as Mike Shannon

Episodes

References

External links
 
 

2018 British television series debuts
2018 British television series endings
2010s British drama television series
2010s British television miniseries
Adultery in television
BBC high definition shows
BBC television dramas
English-language television shows
Espionage television series
Television series by All3Media
Television shows set in India
Television shows set in London
Television series set in the 1940s
Television series set in the 1960s
Television shows set in the United Kingdom
Works about polygamy
World War II television drama series